Black Dog Publishing was a British publishing company specialising in illustrated non-fiction books on contemporary culture. Topics covered by Black Dog include architecture, art, craft, design, environment, fashion, film, music and photography.

This company went into liquidation in January 2018.

Details
The company was founded in 1993. Its website claims it aspires to "take a daring, innovative approach to our titles". It has an emphasis on high production values.

Black Dog has published the Labels Unlimited and Edge Futures series, a series of books by Art on the Underground, the official London Eye book, and a book about the Riot Grrrl movement titled Riot Grrrl: Revolution Girl Style Now!, biographies of such figures as Charlemagne Palestine, Alvar Aalto, Colin St John Wilson, Tod Browning and Jean-Luc Godard. In 2007 Black Dog released Making Stuff for Kids, an instructional craft book for children, in collaboration with The Guardian newspaper.

Authors of Black Dog titles include Rob Young, Lydia Lunch, Bob and Roberta Smith, Carolee Schneemann, Phyllida Barlow, Beth Ditto, Peter Wollen, Suzanne Treister and Karen Knorr.

This company went into liquidation in January 2018 owing more than £700,000. The assets of Black Dog were acquired by St James’s House Media Group.

References

External links
 
Black Dog Publishing profile on the London Book Fair website

Book publishing companies of the United Kingdom
Publishing companies established in 1993
Visual arts publishing companies